Anona is an unincorporated area in Pinellas County, Florida, United States.

History 
In 1883, Captain John Thomas Lowe made a landing here, with the town getting its name from Anona sweet apples from Key West. At first it was going to be named Lowe's landing but its postmaster, from Cedar Key suggested it was to be Anona. In December 1883, the town gained a post office with Jefferson Lowe as its post master. There was a railroad spur that had crossed over the island here that allowed for transportation of goods to and from here (bridge removed in 1928). Soon the post office at the landing was converted to a General Store for the residents here. In 1872, the town got its first church which was made by the residents with Rev. John Wells as its preacher. A year later in 1873, a church board was formed and a schoolhouse was most likely in operation there in the weekdays. In 1882 a second church building was built and is still used today as part of a church. In 1900, the school was moved to the new building. In 1916, a bridge for cars and pedestrians was built across with a toll of 25 cents. The town was later on absorbed into Largo.

References

Pinellas County, Florida